Claire Vernon "Pep" Goodwin was a Federal League baseball player for the Kansas City Packers in 1914–15. He batted left and threw right-handed. He weighed 160 lbs. He went to the University of California. His first game was on April 16, 1914, and his last game was on October 3, 1915. He was born in Pocatello, Idaho on December 19, 1891, and died on February 15, 1972, in Oakland, California.

External links

Major League Baseball shortstops
Kansas City Packers players
Los Angeles Angels (minor league) players
Topeka Savages players
Wichita Witches players
Tulsa Oilers (baseball) players
Sioux City Indians players
Sioux City Cardinals players
Baseball players from Idaho
Sportspeople from Pocatello, Idaho
1891 births
1972 deaths